The Fengshan Longshan Temple is a Chinese temple in Fengshan District, Kaohsiung, Taiwan.

History
The temple is predicted to be constructed in the early years of Qianlong Emperor of Qing Dynasty. It is the second oldest among Taiwan's five Longshan Temples. It has seen been renovated several times.

Transportation
The temple is accessible within walking distance south of Dadong Station of Kaohsiung MRT.

See also
 Fengshan Tiangong Temple
 Bangka Lungshan Temple, Taipei
 Lukang Longshan Temple, Changhua County
 List of temples in Taiwan
 List of tourist attractions in Taiwan

References

External links

Buddhist temples in Taiwan
Temples in Kaohsiung
National monuments of Taiwan